Wonboyn is a village in New South Wales, Australia in Bega Valley Shire. It is on Wonboyn Lake.

Wonboyn provides a secluded vacation spot catering to fisherfolk and campers. Wonboyn Cabins and Campground provides year-round accommodation in a rural setting with access to the lake, its boat ramps, National Forest Preserves and beaches within just a few kilometres.

Notes and references

Towns in New South Wales
Towns in the South Coast (New South Wales)
Coastal towns in New South Wales
Bega Valley Shire